Events from the year 1973 in art.

Events
August 25 – Jesús Soto Museum of Modern Art in Ciudad Bolívar, Venezuela, designed by Carlos Raúl Villanueva, is opened.
Alexander Calder is hired by Braniff International Airways to paint a full-size DC-8-62 as a "flying canvas".
David Hockney begins a 2-year spell living and working in Paris.
Aristeidis Metallinos begins his career as a sculptor.
Robert Scull's collection of American Pop and Minimal art is auctioned by Sotheby's in New York City.

Awards
 Archibald Prize: Janet Dawson – Michael Boddy

Exhibitions
 Christopher Williams – centenary exhibition in Cardiff, Maesteg and Swansea.

Works

 Emma Amos – Sandy and Her Husband
 Michael Ayrton – Icarus (sculpture, London)
 Michael Craig-Martin – An Oak Tree (conceptual work)
 Salvador Dalí – Dalí Seen from the Back Painting Gala from the Back Externalized by Six Virtual Corneas Provisionally Reflected by Six Real Mirrors (stereoscopic painted in duplicate but for a small variation - completed)
 William Eggleston – The Red Ceiling (photograph)
 Ben Enwonwu – Tutu
 Gluck – Credo (Rage, Rage Against the Dying of the Light) (completed)
 Barbara Hepworth – Conversation with Magic Stones
 David Hockney – The Student: Homage to Picasso (print)
 David Inshaw – The Badminton Game
 Nabil Kanso – Place des Martyres (paintings); Vietnam paintings series (through 1974)
 Frederic Littman  – Farewell to Orpheus (bronze, Portland, Oregon)
 Joan Miró – completes series The navigator's hope
 Henry Moore – Large Four Piece Reclining Figure 1972–73 (bronze)
 Ivor Roberts-Jones – Statue of Winston Churchill, Parliament Square (bronze, London)
 Dorothea Tanning - Hôtel du Pavot, Chambre 202 (work completed)
 Euan Uglow – Georgia
 Andy Warhol – Man
 David Wynne
 Embracing Lovers (bronze, Guildhall, London)
 Girl with a Dolphin (bronze, by Tower Bridge, London)

Births
January 29 – Louise Hindsgavl, Danish artist
February 1 – Yuri Landman, Dutch musician, comic book creator and singer
May 8 – Hiromu Arakawa, Japanese manga artist
July 7 – Natsuki Takaya, Japanese manga artist
July 28 (possible date) – Banksy, English graffiti artist
August 18 – Jerome Lagarrigue, French painter and illustrator

Full date unknown
 Jean-Pierre Canlis, American glass artist.
 Oisín McGann, Irish author and illustrator.
 Rosalind Nashashibi, English Palestinian film artist.
 Charles Pétillon, French photographer and instillation artist

Deaths

January to June
January 17 – Tarsila do Amaral, Brazilian modernist artist (b. 1886).
March 14 – Chic Young, American cartoonist (b. 1901).
March 25
Gerda Höglund, Swedish religious painter (b. 1878).
Edward Steichen, American photographer, painter and curator (b. 1879).
April 8 – Pablo Picasso, Spanish painter, draftsman and sculptor (b. 1881).
April 13 – Henry Darger, American outsider artist (b. 1892)
April 28 – Siri Derkert, Swedish artist, sculptor and political campaigner (b. 1888).
May 1 – Asger Jorn, Danish artist and essayist (b. 1914).
May 12 – Edith Tudor Hart, née Suschitzky, Austrian-born photojournalist and communist agent in Britain (b. 1908).
May 16 – Albert Paris Gütersloh, Austrian painter and writer (b. 1887).
May 18 – Ronald Ossory Dunlop, Irish author and painter (b. 1894).
May 21 – Montague Dawson, English maritime painter (b. 1890).

July to December
July 20 – Robert Smithson, American artist (b. 1938).
August 9 – Claude Buckle, English poster artist and watercolourist (b. 1905).
September 30  – Peter Pitseolak, Inuit photographer, artist and historian (b. 1902).
November 13 – Elsa Schiaparelli, Italian fashion designer (b. 1890).
November 17 – Adolf Wissel, German painter, an official artist of Nazism (b. 1894).
December 7 – Camilo Mori, Chilean painter (b. 1896).
December 13 – Ralph Stackpole, American sculptor, painter, muralist, etcher and art educator (b. 1885).
December 16 – Andrej Bicenko, Russian fresco painter and muralist (b. 1886).

See also
 1973 in Fine Arts of the Soviet Union

References

 
Years of the 20th century in art
1970s in art